Shweta Rathore is an international physique Athlete . She is the first female from India who won the medal in world championship (she won bronze medal in 2014 at 6th WBPF World Championship).She won the 49th Asian championship. She is Miss World 2014 Fitness Physique, Miss Asia 2015 Fitness Physique,  Miss India Sports Physique Champion 2015, Miss India 2016, Miss India 2017 she made history by winning Hattrick title.
She is the Founder of Fitness Forever (p) Ltd .

Early life and education 
Shweta Rathore studied bio-chemical engineering at Manipur University. Shweta is an engineer by qualification and was working in a corporate scenario for many years in marketing. Since her school days, she was very much driven by fitness because she had a slightly broad frame. In India, not many people understand the difference between being large frame and being fat, and that’s why people started calling her fat. This thing hit her because she was a very active child and use to take part in cultural activities and sports at her school. Shweta started proper gyming when she was in 8th standard and from there onwards, it continues, and fitness became her lifestyle. She was very much driven into fitness so one day, her brother suggested Shweta to try it professionally, and that's how she came into fitness.

Career 
Rathore is an engineer.

She is the first Indian brand ambassador for Muscletech, and she is the brand ambassador for Avvatar.

Rathore is the founder and president of the NGO God's Beautiful Child.

Awards and honors 
 Miss world 2014 fitness physique
 Miss Asia 2015 Fitness physique
 Hattrick Miss India sports physique champion 2015, 2016,2017
 Awarded by Dubai Government as International Fitness Diva title 2018
 Miss Maharashtra sports physique champion
 First Indian Woman to bag a medal at the Fitness Physique World Championship

References 

emirates247.com

Further reading 
 "My first international body building medal" The Times of India
 "पिता नहीं चाहते थे बेटी करे ये काम" Dainik Bhaskar
 "Fitness 2.0" The Times of India

External links 
 GBC Website
 Shweta Rathore Official Website

Living people
Fitness and figure competitors
Manipur University alumni
Sportswomen from Maharashtra
Year of birth missing (living people)